Rodiani, known before 1927 as Radovishta (Ραδοβίστα), is a community located in Aiani municipal unit, Kozani regional unit, in the Greek region of Macedonia. It is situated at an altitude of 680 meters. The postal code is 50100, while the telephone code is +30 24610. At the 2011 census, the population was 295. 

The town of Kozani, seat of the region, is 14 km from Rodiani.

References

Populated places in Kozani (regional unit)